The N. S. Mason House is a historic house at 58 Tremont Street in Taunton, Massachusetts. Built in 1865, the -story Italianate-style side-hall-plan house features decorative porch and window moldings and bracketed gables and eaves. A large wraparound porch is highlighted by a corner cupola. Its main entrance is flanked by sidelight windows and framed by a molded surround.

The house was added to the National Register of Historic Places in 1984. It is now occupied by a medical clinic.

See also
National Register of Historic Places listings in Taunton, Massachusetts

References

National Register of Historic Places in Taunton, Massachusetts
Houses in Taunton, Massachusetts
Houses on the National Register of Historic Places in Bristol County, Massachusetts
Houses completed in 1865
Italianate architecture in Massachusetts